Battle of Franklin may refer to four battles of the American Civil War:

 Battle of Franklin (1864), a major battle fought November 30, 1864, at Franklin, Tennessee as part of the Franklin-Nashville Campaign
 Battle of Franklin (1863), a minor engagement on April 10, 1863, in Williamson County, Tennessee
 Joint Expedition Against Franklin, fought October 3, 1862, in Franklin, Virginia, and the nearby Blackwater River
 Battle of Irish Bend, fought April 14, 1863 near Franklin, Louisiana

It may also refer to:
 Battle of Franklin (1788), a skirmish between the governments of North Carolina and the unrecognized State of Franklin

See also
Battle of Franklin's Crossing, a skirmish during the Gettysburg campaign